Hatem Bouabid (born 22 August 1966) is a Tunisian weightlifter. He competed in the men's lightweight event at the 1984 Summer Olympics.

References

1966 births
Living people
Tunisian male weightlifters
Olympic weightlifters of Tunisia
Weightlifters at the 1984 Summer Olympics
Place of birth missing (living people)
20th-century Tunisian people